Dera Ghazi Khan , is an administrative subdivision (tehsil) of Dera Ghazi Khan District in the Punjab province of Pakistan. The capital of the tehsil is Dera Ghazi Khan.

History
Dera Ghazi Khan Tehsil was created as a subdivision of Dera Ghazi Khan District during British rule. The population according to the 1901 census of India was 193,744, compared with 177,062 in 1891.

Administration
The tehsil of Dera Ghazi Khan is administratively subdivided into 41 Union Councils, seven of which form the capital - Dera Ghazi Khan, the remaining 34 Unions are:

Basti Ahmadani

References

Dera Ghazi Khan District
Tehsils of Punjab, Pakistan